Beggs may refer to:

People
Beggs (surname)

Places
United States
Beggs, Oklahoma
Fort Beggs, a frontier fort in Illinois, during the Black Hawk War of 1832
Beggs Building, A 12-story building opened in Columbus, Ohio on October 18th, 1928.

See also
Begg